The County of Tripoli (1102–1289) was the last of the Crusader states. It was founded in the Levant in the modern-day region of Tripoli, northern Lebanon and parts of western Syria which supported an indigenous population of Christians, Druze and Muslims.
When the Frankish Crusaders – mostly southern French forces – captured the region in 1109, Bertrand of Toulouse became the first count of Tripoli as a vassal of King Baldwin I of Jerusalem. From that time, the rule of the county was decided not strictly by inheritance but by factors such as military force (external and civil war), favour and negotiation. In 1289 the County of Tripoli fell to Sultan Qalawun of the Muslim Mamluks of Cairo. The county was absorbed into Mamluk Egypt.

Capture by Christian forces

Raymond IV of Toulouse was one of the wealthiest and most powerful of the crusaders. Even so, after the First Crusade, he had failed to secure any land holdings in the Near East. Meanwhile, the County of Edessa, the Kingdom of Jerusalem and the Principality of Antioch had been established. Tripoli was an important strategic goal as it linked the French in the south with the Normans in the north. It was a fertile and well populated area. In 1102, Raymond IV occupied Tortosa (now Tartus) and in 1103, he prepared, together with veterans of the 1101 crusade, to take Tripoli.

Citadel of Raymond de Saint-Gilles
On a natural ridge, which he named "Mons Peregrinus",  from Tripoli, Raymond IV (also known as Raymond de Saint-Gilles) began the construction of a large castle, known in Arabic as Qal'at Sanjil.  Despite this new fortress and seasoned troops, Raymond IV's siege of Tripoli failed to secure the port. He died on 25 February 1105.

Succession
Count William of Cerdagne, Raymond IV's cousin and comrade, was supported by Tancred, Prince of Galilee, but his succession in the Tripoli campaign was challenged by Raymond IV's illegitimate son, Bertrand of Toulouse. Bertrand of Toulouse, who was supported by Baldwin I of Jerusalem, arrived in the Near East with a substantial army and a large Genoese fleet.
In order to resolve the succession issue, Baldwin I created a partition treaty. It specified that William was to hold northern Tripoli and pay homage to Tancred while Bertrand was to hold south Tripoli as a vassal of Baldwin. Under a united Christian onslaught, Tripoli fell on 12 July 1109, completing the Kingdom of Jerusalem. When William died of an arrow through the heart (some claim it was murder), Bertrand became the first count of Tripoli.

Structure and devolution of power

Holdings and vassals

The extent of the County of Tripoli was determined in part by pre-existing Byzantine borders and in part by victory in battle, tempered by the demands of neighbouring crusader states. At its height, the county controlled the coastline from Maraclea in the north to Beirut in the south. Inland, the county's control extended to the Krac des Chevaliers fortress. The rich inland agricultural land of the Homs Gap was known as La Bocquée. 
The county was divided into 'lordships'; areas based roughly around its coastal ports. The Count of Tripoli himself held the port of Tripoli and its surrounds. He also controlled the hostile region of Montferrand, now modern-day Bar'in, Syria, lying to the east. Approximately one quarter of the land seized around Tripoli was given to the Genoese as payment for military aid. The Genoese admiral Guglielmo Embriaco was awarded the city of Byblos.

Homage to the king
Despite his contribution to its establishment, Baldwin I did not directly control the County of Tripoli. Nevertheless, the County of Tripoli owed fealty (allegiance) and homage (declarations of allegiance) to him, and he, in return, provided support to the county in times of trouble.

Defence
Although occupying a narrow coastal plain, the mountain range beyond was a natural defensive line for Tripoli. Several castle forts were built to defend the mountain passes.
Muslim forces (Turk and Egyptian) attacked the County of Tripoli along its borders, especially those to the east. In 1137, Raymond II, the reigning count, lost control of Montferrand. The Muslim position strengthened when the Hashshashin (Nizari Ismailis) forces formed in the Nosairi mountains to the north. In 1144, in order to increase the county's defences, particularly against Zangi of Mosul, Raymond II gave the Knights Hospitaller large stretches of frontier land along the Buqai'ah plain. This included the castles of Krak des Chevaliers, Anaz, Tell Kalakh, Qalaat el Felis and Mardabech. In the 1150s, the defences were further strengthened by the presence of the Knights Templar at Tartus on the seashore.

Religion
In religious matters, the counties of the Kingdom of Jerusalem were expected to follow the lead of the Latin Patriarch of Jerusalem. However, one of the Counts of Tripoli, Pons of Tripoli, had formed an alliance with Antioch, and acknowledged the Latin Patriarch of Antioch. This was so even after a Papal edict to the contrary.

War with the Seljuk Empire 
Shaizar
As a vassal of the Kings of Jerusalem, Bertrand of Tripoli was drawn into war with the Seljuk Turks. In 1111, Mawdud ibn Altuntash, a Turkish military leader, campaigned against Antioch and Edessa. Bertrand of Tripoli and Baldwin I marched to defend the Christians in the north. In joining Tancred and the Count of Edessa at the Battle of Shaizar, their defence of the kingdom was successful.

Hab
In 1119, the Seljuk Empire again attacked Antioch, winning the Battle of Ager Sanguinis. However, Count Pons of Tripoli and Baldwin II defended Antioch and, at the Battle of Hab, successfully defended the flank of the Christian forces.

Azaz
In 1125, Count Pons of Tripoli marched against the Turks who had again attacked Edessa, this time besieging the town of Azaz. Pons of Tripoli, Baldwin II and the Count of Edessa lured the Turks from Azaz and into an ambush on the plains, where the Turkish forces were defeated.

Earthquake of 1170
On 29 June 1170, an earthquake struck the region. The defensive forts of Krac des Chevaliers, Chastel Blanc and al-'Ariymah were damaged. The cathedral of St Mary in Tripoli township was destroyed. The earthquake of 1170 resulted in a brief truce between Nur al-Din and the county (unlike a previous less severe earthquake of 1157 where fighting continued).

Contenders

Bertrand of Toulouse, son of Alphonso-Jordan

Alfonso-Jordan (1103–1148) was the son of Raymond IV and his third wife, Elvira of Castile. Although he was born in Tripoli, Alphonso-Jordan was raised in France. In 1147, he joined the Second Crusade, which was launched in response to the loss of the County of Edessa to Turkish forces. Alphonso died, possibly poisoned, in Caesarea, in 1148. He had an illegitimate son, Bertrand of Toulouse, who continued his progress towards Tripoli. 
Count Raymond II (1115–1152), the grandson of Bertrand, Count of Tripoli, engaged his enemies, Nur al-Din and Unur of Damascus, to confront his cousin, Bertrand. The Turkish forces, having only recently battled Raymond II at the Siege of Damascus, attacked the castle of Arima (al-Ariymah). They captured Bertrand of Toulouse, who spent the following decade in Muslim prisons. He was released in 1159 following the intervention of Manuel Comnenus, emperor of Byzantium. Raymond II later regained Arima. In 1152, Raymond II was killed by the Assassins. He was the first recorded non-Muslim victim of this sect.

Guy II Embriaco
Bohemond VII of Tripoli (1261 – 19 October 1287) was Count of Tripoli and the nominal Prince of Antioch from 1275 until his death. From 1275 to 1277, Bartholomew, Bishop of Tortosa, was Bohemond VII's regent. Paul of Segni, Bishop of Tripoli, who was a friend of the Templar Grandmaster, William of Beaujeu, opposed the succession of Bohemond VII. Ernoul wrote, "This was the beginning of war between Bohemond VII and the Templars."
 
Guy II Embriaco of Giblet (1277–1282) was a former vassal of Bohemond VII in Byblos. Grievances between them had led to enmity and this was part of a larger trade war between Genoa and the Venetians.
The Templars sought to unseat Bohemond VII by supporting Guy II Embriaco. Bohemond VII responded by sacking the Templar house in Tripoli and forests at Montroque. This action led to indecisive fighting over the following months at Botron, Fort Nephin, Sidon and at sea. In 1282, Guy II Embriaco and the Templars were ambushed in Tripoli. Guy, his brothers, and cousins were imprisoned at Fort Nephin and left to starve; his followers were blinded and the Templars were summarily executed.

Benedetto I Zaccaria
After the death of Bohemond VII in 1287, the resulting power vacuum moved the lords of the County of Tripoli to offer Benedetto I Zaccaria (1235–1307), a powerful Genoese merchant, control of the county. In Tripoli, a special non-aristocratic social status had been granted to people from the great mercantile cities of Europe, especially those from the maritime republics of Italy (e.g., Venice). The communes elected Bartholomew Embriaco to the role of Mayor of Tripoli. He also promoted trade with the Genoese.
Bohemond VII had no issue. His mother, Sibylla of Armenia, was discounted in the succession because she was the friend of Bishop Bartholomew of Tortosa, considered an enemy of Tripoli. Bohemond VII's younger sister, Lucie, established herself at Fort Nephin with the support of the Knights Hospitaller. Eventually, Bartholomew Embriaco and the communes decided they could not rule, while Benedetto I Zaccario declined the countship. Thus, after negotiations, Lucie became Lucia, Countess of Tripoli in 1288.

Fall to the Muslims

Constant infighting, lack of resources, a series of poor harvests, changes to trade routes and the local economy and Muslim and Mongol military pressure led to the decline of the Kingdom of Jerusalem. By the 1280s, only two crusader states remained; the remnants of Jerusalem and the County of Tripoli. Even though the Mamluk government of Egypt had a treaty with the county, in March 1289, Tripoli favoured an alliance with the Mongols and as a result Sultan Qalawun of Egypt attacked Tripoli. Despite desperate defense operations, the county fell and was merged with Qalawun's empire.

Vassals of Tripoli

 County of Montferrand
 Lordship of Besmedin
 Lordship of Botron
 Lordship of Buissera
 Lordship of Calmont
 Lordship of Chastel Blanc
 Lordship of Chastel Rouge
 Lordship of Fontaines
 Lordship of Gibelacar
 Lordship of Gibelet
 Lordship of La Colée
 Lordship of Le Puy
 Seigneury of Moinetre
 Lordship of Nephin
 Lordship of Raisagium Montanée
 Lordship of Terra Galifa
 Lordship of Tokle
 Lordship of Tortosa Maraclea
 Krak des Chevaliers

Counts of Tripoli
Raymond IV of Toulouse (1102–1105)
Alfonso-Jordan (1105–1109)
William-Jordan, as regent (1105–1109)
Bertrand of Toulouse (1109–1112)
Pons of Tripoli (1112–1137)
Raymond II of Tripoli (1137–1152)
Raymond III of Tripoli (1152–1187)
Raymond IV of Tripoli (1187–1189), son of Bohemond III of Antioch.
Bohemond IV of Antioch-Tripoli (1189 – 1233, also Prince of Antioch 1201 – 1216 and 1219 – 1233)
Bohemond V of Antioch-Tripoli (1233 – 1252, also Prince of Antioch)
Bohemond VI of Antioch-Tripoli (1252 – 1275, also Prince of Antioch 1252 – 1268)
Bohemond VII of Antioch-Tripoli (1275–1287)
Lucia of Tripoli (1287–1289)

Tripoli is lost to Egyptian forces:

Lucia of Tripoli (1289 – c.1299)
Philippe II de Toucy (c.1299 – 1300)

Tripoli passes to the Kings of Cyprus and Jerusalem:

Peter I of Cyprus (1345–1359)
Peter II of Cyprus (1359–1369)
James of Lusignan (? – c. 1396), cousin
John of Lusignan (c. 1396 – c. 1430), son
Peter of Lusignan (c. 1430 – 1451), brother, Regent of Cyprus
Juan Tafures (1469–1473)

Great officers of Tripoli

References 

 
1289 disestablishments in Asia
States and territories established in 1102
Counties of the Crusader states
1100s establishments in the Kingdom of Jerusalem
12th century in the Kingdom of Jerusalem
13th century in the Kingdom of Jerusalem
County
Former monarchies
Vassal and tributary states of the Mongol Empire